Harry Woodward (1887 – after 1909) was an English professional footballer who played as a full-back. He played non-league football for Hednesford Town before joining Football League Second Division side Burnley in October 1908. Woodward made his league debut for Burnley on 13 March 1909 in the 1–2 defeat away at Wolverhampton Wanderers. He played two more matches the following season before leaving the club in the summer of 1910.

References

1887 births
Association football defenders
Burnley F.C. players
English footballers
English Football League players
Hednesford Town F.C. players
Year of death missing